The 2015 Sacramento State Hornets football team represented California State University, Sacramento as a member of the Big Sky Conference during the 2015 NCAA Division I FCS football season. Led by second-year head coach Jody Sears, Sacramento State compiled an overall record of 2–9 with a mark of 1–7 in conference play, tying for 12th place in the Big Sky. The Hornets played home games at Hornet Stadium in Sacramento, California.

Schedule

Despite Weber State also being a member of the Big Sky Conference, the September 19 game against Sacramento State was considered a non-conference game.

Game summaries

Eastern Oregon

at Washington

at Weber State

Eastern Washington

Northern Colorado

at Montana State

at Southern Utah

Idaho State

at Cal Poly

at Northern Arizona

UC Davis

References

Sacramento State
Sacramento State Hornets football seasons
Sacramento State Hornets football